The Bulgarian Women's Basketball Championship is the premier league for women's basketball clubs in Bulgaria. Slavia Sofia is the championship's most successful club with 15 titles between 1953 and 2004 followed by Akademik Sofia and Levski Sofia with eight titles, Lokomotiv Sofia with seven and Minyor Pernik with six, while Neftokhimik Burgas has been the most successful team in recent years with 5 titles since 2005.

The championship's leading teams were fairly successful in FIBA Europe competitions during the communist era, with Slavia Sofia and Levski Sofia winning three European Cups and two Ronchetti Cups between 1959 and 1984. Maritsa Plovdiv and Minyor Pernik also played in European finals.

History

2018-19 teams
 Beroe Stara Zagora
 Montana
 Slavia Sofia
 NSA
 WBC Septemvri 97
 Akademic Plovdiv
 Lokomotiv St. Zagora
 WBC Champion 2006 Sofia

List of champions

 1945 Rakovski Sofia
 1946 Rakovski Sofia
 1947 Rakovski Sofia
 1948 Lokomotiv Sofia
 1949 Lokomotiv Sofia
 1950 Lokomotiv Sofia
 1951 Lokomotiv Sofia
 1952 Lokomotiv Sofia
 1953 Slavia Sofia
 1954 Slavia Sofia
 1955 Slavia Sofia
 1956 Slavia Sofia
 1957 Slavia Sofia
 1958 Slavia Sofia
 1959 Slavia Sofia
 1960 Akademik Sofia
 1961 Slavia Sofia
 1962 Slavia Sofia
 1963 Slavia Sofia
 1964 Slavia Sofia
 1965 Slavia Sofia
 1966 Akademik Sofia
 1967 Lokomotiv Sofia

 1968 Akademik Sofia
 1969 Akademik Sofia
 1970 Akademik Sofia
 1971 Maritsa Plovdiv
 1972 Minyor Pernik
 1973 Maritsa Plovdiv
 1974 Maritsa Plovdiv
 1975 Akademik Sofia
 1976 Akademik Sofia
 1977 Minyor Pernik
 1978 Minyor Pernik
 1979 Minyor Pernik
 1980 Levski Sofia
 1981 Minyor Pernik
 1982 Akademik Sofia
 1983 Levski Sofia
 1984 Levski Sofia
 1985 Levski Sofia
 1986 Levski Sofia
 1987 Levski Sofia
 1988 Levski Sofia
 1989 Kremikovtsi
 1990 Beroe Stara Zagora

 1991 Lokomotiv Sofia
 1992 Beroe Stara Zagora
 1993 Kremikovtsi
 1994 Levski Sofia
 1995 Montana
 1996 Minyor Pernik
 1997 Kremikovtsi
 1998 Kremikovtsi
 1999 Kremikovtsi
 2000 Montana
 2001 Akademic Plovdiv
 2002 Slavia Sofia
 2003 Slavia Sofia
 2004 Slavia Sofia
 2005 Neftokhimik Burgas
 2006 Neftokhimik Burgas
 2007 CSKA Sofia
 2008 Dunav Ruse
 2009 Neftokhimik Burgas
 2010 Neftokhimik Burgas
 2011 Neftokhimik Burgas
 2012 Dunav Ruse
 2013 Dunav Ruse

 2014 Dunav Ruse
 2015 Dunav Ruse
 2016 Montana 2003
 2017 Haskovo 2012
 2018 Montana 2003
 2019 Montana 2003
 2021 Beroe Stara Zagora

References

lea
Bulgaria
Sports leagues established in 1942
Basketball leagues in Bulgaria
Basket
Professional sports leagues in Bulgaria